Michael McCann (born 2 January 1964)
is a British Labour Party politician who was the Member of Parliament (MP) for East Kilbride, Strathaven and Lesmahagow 2010–2015. He was formerly a councillor in South Lanarkshire, serving on the planning and estates committees.

Political career
McCann was elected as a councillor in South Lanarkshire in 2003 and 2007.

He was elected to the UK Parliament in 2010 as the MP for the East Kilbride, Strathaven and Lesmahagow seat, succeeding Adam Ingram. McCann was chairman of the Scottish Parliamentary Labour Party. He served on the International Development Committee in the 2010–2015 Parliament and is a member of Labour Friends of Israel.

McCann is known to be a fierce critic of the Scottish National Party, and ruled out any formal post-election deal with them in March 2015. He lost the seat in the subsequent general election to the SNP's Lisa Cameron, part of the landslide 56 SNP MPs returned on 7 May 2015.

At the 2019 general election, McCann backed Epsom and Ewell MP Chris Grayling, Boris Johnson and the Conservative Party, saying "a vote for anyone else is a vote for Jeremy Corbyn - and a Corbyn government would be disastrous for Britain."

References

External links
archive of www.michaelmccann.org.uk

1964 births
Living people
UK MPs 2010–2015
Scottish Labour MPs
Labour Friends of Israel
Politicians from Glasgow
Councillors in South Lanarkshire